Terrazoanthus is a genus of corals belonging to the family Hydrozoanthidae.

The species of this genus are found in the coasts of America, Africa and Japan.

Species:

Terrazoanthus californicus 
Terrazoanthus minutus 
Terrazoanthus onoi 
Terrazoanthus patagonichus 
Terrazoanthus sinnigeri

References

Hydrozoanthidae
Hexacorallia genera